The Vanishing Thieves is the 66th title of the Hardy Boys Mystery Stories, written by Franklin W. Dixon. Wanderer Books published this book in 1981 and Grosset & Dunlap published this book in 2005.  As of 2018, this is the last Hardy Boys story to be published by Grosset & Dunlap.

Plot summary
Chet Morton's cousin, Vern, is on his way to California to find a rare and valuable coin mysteriously missing from his uncle's bank vault. When he stops in Bayport, his brand-new car is stolen. The Hardys take on a double mystery – and double danger – as they head for the West Coast to investigate this sinister mystery.

Notes

Grosset & Dunlap only had the license for volumes 59-66 from 2005 to 2013.

References

The Hardy Boys books
1981 American novels
1981 children's books
Novels set in California